Martinice may refer to places in the Czech Republic:

Martinice (Kroměříž District), a municipality and village in the Zlín Region
Martinice (Žďár nad Sázavou District), a municipality and village in the Vysočina Region
Martinice u Onšova, a municipality and village in the Vysočina Region
Martinice v Krkonoších, a municipality and village in the Liberec Region
Martinice, a village and part of Březnice (Příbram District) in the Central Bohemian Region
Martinice, a village and part of Jenišovice (Chrudim District) in the Pardubice Region
Martinice, a village and part of Jesenice (Příbram District) in the Central Bohemian Region
Martinice, a village and part of Proseč in the Pardubice Region
Martinice, a village and part of Votice in the Central Bohemian Region
The Bohemian Martinic noble family (of Martinice) are connected to this locale and its castle
Martinice u Dolních Kralovic, a village and part of Dolní Kralovice in the Central Bohemian Region

See also
Martinić, a Croatian surname